Gerard Williams was a Negro league shortstop in the 1920s.

Williams attended Morehouse College, and made his Negro leagues debut in 1921 with the Pittsburgh Keystones. He went on to play for the Cleveland Tate Stars, Indianapolis ABCs, and Lincoln Giants, and finished his career in 1925 with the Homestead Grays.

References

External links
 and Baseball-Reference Black Baseball stats and Seamheads

Place of birth missing
Place of death missing
Year of birth missing
Year of death missing
Cleveland Tate Stars players
Homestead Grays players
Indianapolis ABCs players
Lincoln Giants players
Pittsburgh Keystones players
Baseball shortstops